WWDT-CD, virtual channel 43 (UHF digital channel 30), is a low-power, Class A Telemundo owned-and-operated television station serving Fort Myers, Florida, United States that is licensed to Naples. The station is owned by the Telemundo Station Group subsidiary of NBCUniversal. WWDT-CD's studios are located on South Tamiami Trail in Bonita Springs, and its transmitter is located between Old 41 Road and Michael G. Rippe Parkway south of Fort Myers.

Sale to NBCUniversal
On December 4, 2017, NBCUniversal's Telemundo Station Group announced its purchase of ZGS Communications' 13 television stations, including WWDT-CD. The sale was completed on February 1, 2018.

Subchannels
The station's digital signal is multiplexed:

References

External links

Telemundo Station Group
LX (TV network) affiliates
WDT-CD
Low-power television stations in the United States
Television channels and stations established in 1993
WDT-CD
1993 establishments in Florida